Amastus rubicundus is a moth of the family Erebidae first described by Hervé de Toulgoët in 1981. It is found in Peru.

References

Moths described in 1981
rubicundus
Moths of South America